Yang Hee-kyung (born December 3, 1954) is a South Korean actress.

Filmography

Television series

Film

Theater

Discography

Awards and nominations

References

External links
 
 
 

1954 births
Living people
20th-century South Korean actresses
21st-century South Korean actresses
South Korean stage actresses
South Korean musical theatre actresses
South Korean television actresses
South Korean film actresses
Actresses from Seoul
Cheongju Yang clan